Mikee Forever is a 1999 Philippine television situational comedy series broadcast by GMA Network. Directed by Ipe Pelino, it stars Mikee Cojuangco-Jaworski. It premiered on March 10, 1999. The series concluded on September 1, 1999 with a total of 26 episodes.

A reformatted version of Mikee's self-titled drama anthology Mikee. Cojuangco and Viva Television behind the drama anthology decided to come up a comedy show for a change.

Cast and characters
Lead cast
 Mikee Cojuangco-Jaworski as Mikaela / Mikee

Supporting cast
 Edu Manzano as George
 Rufa Mae Quinto
 Sherilyn Reyes
 Sunshine Dizon
 Polo Ravales
 Rez Cortez
 Red Sternberg
 Maureen Larrazabal

References

1999 Philippine television series debuts
1999 Philippine television series endings
Filipino-language television shows
GMA Network original programming
Philippine comedy television series